The Best of Woodstock is a 1-CD live compilation album of the 1969 Woodstock Festival in Bethel, New York. Its release marked the 25th anniversary of the festival. It contains tracks which were already released on the original Woodstock: Music from the Original Soundtrack and More album. Shortly after the album's release, Atlantic Records released a much longer 4-CD box set entitled Woodstock: Three Days of Peace and Music, which contained tracks from the original album, Woodstock 2, and numerous additional, previously-unreleased performances from the festival, but not the stage announcements and crowd noises.

Track listing
John B. Sebastian – "I Had a Dream" : 2:41
Canned Heat – "Going Up the Country" : 3:20
Richie Havens – "Freedom" : 5:26 
Country Joe McDonald – "The Fish Cheer / I-Feel-Like-I'm-Fixin'-to-Die Rag" : 3:08
Joan Baez – "Joe Hill" : 3:13
Crosby, Stills, Nash & Young – "Wooden Ships" : 5:56
The Who – "We're Not Gonna Take It" : 5:05
Joe Cocker – "With a Little Help from My Friends" : 8:39
Santana – "Soul Sacrifice" : 11:09
Jefferson Airplane – "Volunteers" : 2:58
Ten Years After – "I'm Going Home" : 9:30
Jimi Hendrix – "The Star-Spangled Banner" / "Purple Haze" / "Instrumental Solo" : 13:39

References
"The Best of Woodstock" on AllMusic.com

1994 live albums
1994 compilation albums
Live rock albums
Rock compilation albums
Atlantic Records compilation albums
Atlantic Records live albums
Woodstock Festival